Weston under Penyard Halt railway station is a disused wood built railway station that served the village of Weston under Penyard in Herefordshire on the Hereford, Ross and Gloucester Railway. Opened in 1929 to compete with local road transport it was located on the Great Western Railway line linking Ross-on-Wye and Gloucester. Nothing remains of the station.

References

Further reading

External links
 Weston under Penyard Halt on a navigable 1946 O. S. map

Former Great Western Railway stations
Disused railway stations in Herefordshire
Railway stations in Great Britain opened in 1929
Railway stations in Great Britain closed in 1964
Beeching closures in England